Hikueru Airport  is an airport on the atoll of Hikueru, part of the Tuamotu Archipelago in French Polynesia. The airport is adjacent to the village of Tupapati.

Airlines and destinations

References

Airports in French Polynesia